Woodward County is a county located in the U.S. state of Oklahoma. As of the 2010 census, the population was 20,081. Its county seat is Woodward.

Woodward County comprises the Woodward, OK Micropolitan Statistical Area.

Woodward County was originally known as "N" County and was composed of present-day Woodward County and portions of Harper, Ellis, and Woods County.  Before its division at statehood, Woodward County, then 60 miles square, was the westernmost county of the Cherokee Outlet and adjoined Texas and the Oklahoma Panhandle on the west and Kansas on the north. Political pressure applied by William H. Murray during Oklahoma's Constitutional Convention resulted in the reduction of the size of Woodward County to its present boundaries.  It is unknown exactly whom the county (and the town) is named after, but the two leading candidates are Brinton W. Woodward, a Santa Fe railway director, or Richard Woodward, a buffalo hunter.

History
In the 19th century, the county was part of a well-used military transportation corridor that was important to frontier defense. In 1868, Camp Supply, was established as a depot leading up to a campaign against the Cheyenne.  From 1876 through the 1880s massive herds of cattle passed through the southwestern corner of the county along the Great Western Trail from Texas to Kansas.

The Southern Kansas Railway, later acquired by the Atchison, Topeka and Santa Fe Railway built a line southwest from Kiowa, Kansas, through the region and into Texas during 1886–1887.  It began the town of Woodward where the railroad crossed the military road. The Wichita Falls and Northwestern Railway, controlled by the Missouri, Kansas and Texas Railway, constructed a north–south line from Elk City through Sharon, Woodward, and the town of Fort Supply to Forgan, in Beaver County, in 1911–12.

In September 1893, when the Cherokee Outlet opened for non-Indian settlement, Woodward County was created as County N in Oklahoma Territory, though its area was much larger than at present.  In a November 6, 1894, election, the county was renamed Woodward County.  Statehood in 1907 redrew the boundaries of the county, while the remainder was given to the present Harper, Ellis and Woods counties.

Geography
The Cimarron River forms part of the northern boundary and drains the northwestern section of the county. The North Canadian River flows through the county from the northwest to the southeast. The southern part of the county drains into the Canadian River. Fort Supply Lake, on Wolf Creek, lies in Woodward County.

The county is part of the Osage Plains and lies within the Western Red Prairies physiographic region and Gypsum Hills subregion. There are gypsum hills in the eastern and northwestern parts of the county. Protected areas in the county are Alabaster Caverns State Park and Boiling Springs State Park.

Adjacent counties
 Dewey County (south)
 Ellis County (west)
 Harper County (northwest)
 Major County (east)
 Woods County (northeast)

Demographics

As of the 2010 United States Census, there were 20,081 people and 5,106 families residing in the county.  The population density was 16.1 people per square mile (6.2/km2).  There were 8,838 housing units at an average density of 7.1 per square mile (2.7/km2).  The racial makeup of the county was 86.7% white, 1.6% black or African American, 2.8% Native American, 0.6% Asian, less than 0.1% Pacific Islander, 5.6% from other races, and 2.6% from two or more races.  10.6% of the population were Hispanic or Latino of any race.

There were 7,654 households in the county, out of which 2,322 (30.3%) included children under the age of 18, 4,132 (54%) were married couples living together, 8.5% had a female householder with no husband present, and 32% were non-families.  Individuals living alone accounted for 28% of households.  The average household size was 2.46 and the average family size was 3.

In the county, the population was spread out, with 24.3% under the age of 18, 8.5% from 18 to 24, 27.1% from 25 to 44, 25.9% from 45 to 64, and 14.2% who were 65 years of age or older.  The median age was 37 years. For every 100 females there were 79 males.  For every 100 females age 18 and over, there were 89 males.

The median income for a household in the county was $51,087, and the median income for a family was $60,684.  Males had a median income of $48,228 versus $26,993 for females.  The per capita income for the county was $24,735.  About 6.5% of families and 12.4% of the population were below the poverty line, including 16% of those under age 18 and 11.8% of those age 65 or over.

Politics

In 2015, surveys identified Woodward County as one of the most climate science doubting counties in the United States.

Economy
Agriculture and cattle production have been very important to the county income since before statehood. Grains, especially wheat, were the largest crop. However, broomcorn grew abundantly. Broom factories operated in Woodward and Mooreland. Castor beans, grown during World War I, were processed into castor oil, which was used as a lubricant for aircraft engines.

Extractive industries became relatively more important during the 1920s, while agriculture began to decline. Mineral production included salt, bentonite and petroleum. Natural gas production began in 1956. In 1975, a plant was built near Woodward to extract iodine from oil field brine. It soon supplied 14% of the nation's supply of the chemical.

Communities

City
 Woodward (county seat)

Towns
 Fort Supply
 Mooreland
 Mutual
 Sharon

Unincorporated communities

 Belva
 Cedardale
 Curtis
 Gerlach
 Keenan
 Quinlan
 Richmond
 Tangier

NRHP sites

Wodward county has the following site on the National Register of Historic Places
 Fort Supply
 Fort Supply Historic District
 Woodward
 L. L. Stine House
 Woodward Crystal Beach Park
 Woodward Federal Courthouse and Post Office

References

 
1893 establishments in Oklahoma Territory
Populated places established in 1893